Lihen Jonas (born 22 October 1998) is a female sprinter from Federated States of Micronesia. She competed in the Women's 100 metres event at the 2015 World Championships in Athletics in Beijing, China.

See also
 Federated States of Micronesia at the 2015 World Championships in Athletics

References

1998 births
Living people
Federated States of Micronesia female sprinters
Place of birth missing (living people)
World Athletics Championships athletes for the Federated States of Micronesia